The UNOH 175 was a NASCAR Camping World Truck Series race held at New Hampshire Motor Speedway in Loudon, New Hampshire from 1996 to 2017. Since 2013 it was held the day before the Sprint Cup Series Sylvania 300, the second event in the Chase for the Sprint Cup.

The race was 200 laps in length from 1996 until 2010, when the distance was shortened to 175 laps. After a two-year absence from the 2012 and 2013 Truck Series schedules, it returned to the series schedule in 2014. On March 8, 2017 it was announced that Las Vegas Motor Speedway would get a second Cup date, second Xfinity date, and second Truck date. The Cup and Truck races that will be given to Vegas will come from New Hampshire, making the 2017 running the last race.

Past winners

1996, 1999, 2000, & 2002: This race was extended due to a NASCAR Overtime finish.
2004: Race delayed 5 hours due to rain from Hurricane Ivan but eventually got underway. After a caution came out with two laps to go in the scheduled distance, an overtime finish was planned, but darkness had rolled in due to the late start. Instead of having an overtime finish, officials decided to end the race under caution at the end of the scheduled distance.
2014: This was Cole Custer's first truck win, making him the youngest winner in NASCAR national touring series history at 16 years, 7 months and 28 days.

Multiple winners (drivers)

Multiple winners (teams)

Manufacturer wins

References

External links
 

Former NASCAR races
NASCAR Truck Series races
 
Recurring sporting events established in 1996
1996 establishments in New Hampshire
Recurring sporting events disestablished in 2017